Archirhodomyrtus beckleri, the "small-leaved myrtle", or "rose myrtle", is a shrub or small tree native to rainforest areas of eastern Australia.

Rose myrtle leaves are 2–8 cm long and 1.5-2.5 cm wide, lanceolate, glossy and pleasantly fragrant when crushed. Flowers are 1 cm across, white, mauve or pink. The edible berry is 0.5-0.8 cm across, globular, yellow orange or red, containing numerous small seeds.

Uses
The berry has a pleasant aromatic flavor reminiscent of Brazilian cherry. It can be eaten out-of-hand or used in sauces and preserves.

References

Bushfood
Myrtaceae
Flora of New South Wales
Flora of Queensland
Trees of Australia
Taxa named by Ferdinand von Mueller